KLSF may refer to:

 KLSF (FM), a radio station (89.7 FM) licensed to Juneau, Alaska, United States
 Lawson Army Airfield (ICAO code KLSF)